Manduca albiplaga, the white-plaqued sphinx, is a moth of the family Sphingidae. It was first described by Francis Walker in 1856.

Distribution 
Its range is from Brazil to southern Mexico, although a stray has been recorded as far north as Kansas.

Description 
Its wingspan is 120–180 mm.

Biology 
The larvae feed on plants of the family Boraginaceae and some in the family Annonaceae including Rollinia deliciosa.

References

External links
White-plagued sphinx Moths of North America

Manduca
Moths of North America
Moths of South America
Moths described in 1856